Passeio Público (Public Park) is the name for various parks in the Portuguese-speaking world.
Passeio Público (Lisbon)
Passeio Público (Rio de Janeiro)